Astragalus hamosus, the southern milk vetch or European milk vetch, is a plant in the family Fabaceae.

Sources

References 

hamosus
Flora of Malta